The North East LHIN is one of fourteen Local Health Integration Networks (LHINs) in the Canadian province of Ontario.

The North East Local Health Integration Network is a community-based, non-profit organization funded by the Government of Ontario through the Ministry of Health and Long-Term Care.

Services
North East LHIN plans, funds and coordinates the following operational public health care services to a population of approximately 550,000 people:
	
 34 Hospitals - see below
 42 Long-Term Care Homes
 1 Community Care Access Centre (CCAC)
 64 Community Support Service Agencies
 48 Mental Health and Addiction Agencies
 6 Community Health Centres (CHCs)

Hospitals

Geographic area 
Marie to Mattawa.

Budget 
The North East LHIN has an annual budget of approximately $1.4 billion.

External links 
 
 North East LHIN  - About Our LHIN

References

Health regions of Ontario